Betsy Nagelsen and Elizabeth Smylie were the defending champions but did not compete that year.

Christiane Jolissaint and Dianne Van Rensburg won in the final 6–1, 6–3 against Maria Lindström and Claudia Porwik.

Seeds
Champion seeds are indicated in bold text while text in italics indicates the round in which those seeds were eliminated.

 Lori McNeil /  Mercedes Paz (quarterfinals)
 Isabelle Demongeot /  Nathalie Tauziat (semifinals)
 Christiane Jolissaint /  Dianne Van Rensburg (champions)
 Mary Joe Fernández /  Catarina Lindqvist (quarterfinals)

Draw

References
 1988 European Open Doubles Draw

WTA Swiss Open
European Open - Doubles